Uzbekistan Pro-B League (Uzbek: O'zbekiston Pro-B ligasi / Ўзбекистон Про-Б Лигаси; Russian: Про лига Б Узбекистана) is the third level (after the Super League and Pro League) football league in Uzbekistan

History
Since the foundation in 2018 and until was  the «Uzbekistan Pro-B League» (Uzbek: O'zbekiston Pro-B ligasi / Ўзбекистон Про-Б лигаси; Russian: Про лига-Б Узбекистана).

Structure of the league
On 21 November 2017 according to the UzPFL management decision the Uzbekistan First League was officially renamed to Uzbekistan Pro-B League starting from the 2018 season. The league has been reduced from 18 (2017) to 16 teams.

In 2020 in the Pro-B League Uzbekistan involved 16 teams in a double round system (28 rounds), home and away. The winner of the Uzbekistan Pro-B League receives the permit in the Uzbekistan Pro League, and the club took third place in the Pro League gets a place in the play-offs, consisting of two matches (home and away) where his opponent will be the Pro-B League club, who took there the penultimate eleventh place. The winner of the playoffs gets a chance in Pro League Uzbekistan, and the losing club will start the new season in the Pro-B League Uzbekistan. The clubs finishing in last place in the Pro-B League, will start the season in the Uzbekistan Second League — the fourth level and the importance of football in the country.

The division is run by Uzbekistan Professional Football League(UzPFL) and Uzbekistan Football Association (UFA).

Current Club

Winners and promotions by season

See also
 Uzbekistan Super League
 Uzbekistan Pro League
 Uzbekistan Second League
 Uzbekistan Cup
 Uzbekistan League Cup

References

External links
 

 
3
Sports leagues established in 2018
Third level football leagues in Asia
2018 establishments in Uzbekistan